Liverpool is an electoral district of the Legislative Assembly of the Australian state of New South Wales in Sydney's West. It is currently represented by Paul Lynch of the Labor Party.

The district is located in Western Sydney, within the boundaries of the Liverpool City Council. It includes the suburbs of Ashcroft, Busby, Carnes Hill, Cartwright, Green Valley, Heckenberg, Hinchinbrook, Horningsea Park, Hoxton Park, Liverpool, Miller, Sadleir, Warwick Farm and West Hoxton.

History
Liverpool was created in 1950 and has since always been represented by a member of the Labor Party. It has historically been one of the safest  seats in New South Wales and is considered a part of Labor's heartland in Western Sydney.
At the 2011 election it became the safest ALP seat with sitting member Paul Lynch winning 64.7% of the two party preferred vote although Ron Hoenig won a larger vote at the Heffron by-election held in August 2012 but that was achieved in the absence of a Liberal opponent.

Members for Liverpool

Election results

References

Liverpool